William Paul is a former Scottish international lawn and indoor bowler.

Bowls career
He won a silver medal in the triples at the 1988 World Outdoor Bowls Championship in Auckland.

He was a national champion in 1984 after winning the singles at the Scottish National Bowls Championships.

Football
Willie is also a former Third Lanark A.C. goalkeeper, having played 22 games in season 1963–64.

References

Living people
Scottish male bowls players
1944 births